FDR Skatepark is a skatepark located in Philadelphia, Pennsylvania, United States. It is accessible from the Pattison Avenue stop of the Broad Street subway line. The park has long been popular with notable local skaters such as Willy Akers, Chuck Treece, Bam Margera, Kerry Getz and various other local pro skaters. The park was built on unused public land in Franklin Delano Roosevelt Park beneath an overpass of Interstate 95. The park came to be through volunteer labor and donations of materials. Over time the park has expanded with additions and inclusions to the area around the original components of the park.

The park was born because Philadelphia’s government wanted to put a stop to skateboarding at Love Park.  Their solution was to set aside 16,000 square feet of real estate beneath the highway.  City Hall thought this was going to be enough to solve the problems caused by skaters in the city, but after about a year, the locals got restless.  With inspiration from Burnside and tired if waiting on the City, the people took matters into their own hands and started building a transition up a support pole, a corner bowl, and a mogul or two between that.

In 2019, Philly officials released that they had created a new, $200 million plan to turn the FDR skatepark into an ‘urban oasis.’ The plan brings new amenities and things that will draw more visitors to the area.  Feedback that was given by the community mentioned that people of South Philly, and FDR skatepark users love opportunities to connect with nature and safe walking and biking trails.  New additions to the park include elevated boardwalks, an expansion on the Shed Brook Creek so visitors can kayak, The Franklin 5k— a 3.1 mile trail, a “great lawn,” and the completion of the field.  This plan was created after the infrastructure of the park was damaged from years of flooding.

Features
Created by skaters, for skaters, it is considered within the skateboarding community to be an excellent park with endless speed lines. The park has several "areas", including the core park that lies under the aforementioned overpass, the neighboring and connecting pool section, and a mini ramp and vert ramp. South Philadelphia's FDR Skate Park has been described by professionals and in magazine articles such as Thrasher and Skateboarder to be a concrete, skateboard 'paradise', as it was designed and built by skateboard enthusiasts. As mentioned the park is situated right under the I-95 highway overpass, right off Broad Street, so it is protected from rain and snow.

Popularity
FDR played host to the Gravity Games in 2005. The whole Park is also playable in the video game Tony Hawk's Proving Ground by Activision and Neversoft. The park has been featured in countless skate videos since the mid-1990s, including Transworld IE and Toy Machine's Jump Off A Building. It is featured in hundreds of skateboard and videos on YouTube, through contests, and every day footage.

References

External links
Review of FDR Skatepark

Skateparks in the United States
Municipal parks in Philadelphia
South Philadelphia